James Vincent Chester Guest (born 20 October 1937) is a former Australian politician.

He was born in Melbourne to James Chester Guest, a business manager and Chairman of the Commercial Bank of Australia, and Patricia, née Hammond. A graduate of Geelong Grammar School, he attended Brasenose College at Oxford University, where he received a Master of Arts; he became a barrister-at-law in Lincoln's Inn in 1960. From 1961 he was an associate to Sir Owen Dixon, Chief Justice of Australia; in 1963 he returned to Victoria as a barrister. In 1976 he was elected to the Victorian Legislative Council as a Liberal member for Monash. He served on a number of committees but never rose from the backbench. He retired in 1996.

References

1937 births
Living people
Liberal Party of Australia members of the Parliament of Victoria
Members of the Victorian Legislative Council
People educated at Geelong Grammar School